Auburn Bay is a suburban residential neighbourhood in the southeast quadrant of Calgary, Alberta. It is located at the southeastern edge of the city, and is bounded by Seton Boulevard to the south, Deerfoot Trail to the west, 52 Street E to the east and Stoney Trail to the north.

The South Health Campus and southeast Calgary hospital is located immediately to the south of the community. The Green Line of the CTrain will run along the community's eastern boundary, parallel to 52 Street.

Auburn Bay has a Residents Association https://auburnbayra.ca/ and a Community Association https://www.auburnbayliving.ca/. 

It is represented in the Calgary City Council by the Ward 12 councillor.

A diverse community which is home to over 5400 houses. Auburn Bay Community is home to two schools Auburn Bay K-4 https://school.cbe.ab.ca/school/auburnbay/ & Prince of Peace K-9 https://cssd.ab.ca/schools/princeofpeace/, Future Catholic Elementary & Public Junior Highschool. 15 playgrounds, an off leash dog park, Auburn Station commercial mall, future home to LRT transit, walking/cycling trails, 2 baseball fields, 2 large soccer fields, 2 ponds and a lake.

Demographics 
In the City of Calgary's 2019 municipal census, Auburn Bay had a population of 17,607 living in 6,046 dwellings. With a land area of 4.5km2 (1.7 sq mi), it had a population density of 1,598/km2 (4,140/sq mi) in 2012.

Ward 12 2019 Civic Census Numbers
AUB - Resident Count 17,607 - Dwelling Count 6,046

Auburn Bay Ages
0-4: 1,825
5-14: 3,345
15-19: 808
20-24: 593
25-34: 3,232
35-44: 4,109
45-54: 1,905
55-64: 983
65-74: 577
75+: 215
Male: 8,722
Female: 8,831
Other: 39

Auburn Bay Preschool aged children 2,398 (1 of the top 9 communities in Calgary)
Auburn Bay places 11 on top 20 Communities by Population

See also
List of neighbourhoods in Calgary

References

External links

 

Neighbourhoods in Calgary